John David Gaskell (born 5 October 1940) is an English former football goalkeeper. Gaskell started his career as a youth player with Manchester United. He helped United win several trophies during the 1960s. He left the club for Wrexham in June 1969.

Career
Born in Orrell, Lancashire, Gaskell began his football career with Manchester United F.C. having been spotted playing for youth team Orrell St Luke's. He made his senior debut for United on 24 October 1956, when he played in the 1956 FA Charity Shield at the age of 16 years and 19 days, making him the youngest player ever to have played for the club. His league debut came over a year later, in a 4–3 home defeat to Tottenham Hotspur on 30 November 1957.

He was not with the Manchester United squad when their aeroplane crashed at Munich on the way home from a European Cup tie on 6 February 1958, killing eight players.

By the early 1960s, he had become a regular in the United first team, covering for first choice goalkeeper Harry Gregg. The zenith of Gaskell's career came in 1963, when he kept goal for United in their 1963 FA Cup Final win over Leicester City.

A succession of injuries to Gregg meant that Gaskell was in and out of the first team on a regular basis, but the signing of Pat Dunne in May 1964 meant that Gaskell was relegated to the position of third-choice goalkeeper. Both Gregg and Dunne left in 1966, but the arrival of Alex Stepney and the emergence of young Jimmy Rimmer meant that Gaskell was still third-choice at the club, so he left in the summer of 1969.

On departing from Old Trafford, Gaskell signed for Wrexham and remained there for three years. He worked for Post Office Telephones (now BT) for a short period before moving to South Africa, where he played for Arcadia Shepherds until his retirement.

Honours
 Football League First Division: 1964–65, 1966–67
 FA Cup: 1963
 FA Community Shield: 1956

References

External links
 David Gaskell at StretfordEnd.co.uk
 David Gaskell at MUFCInfo.com
 

1940 births
Living people
People from Orrell
English footballers
Association football goalkeepers
Manchester United F.C. players
Wrexham A.F.C. players
Arcadia Shepherds F.C. players
English Football League players
FA Cup Final players